Francesco Darosio (1744 – 1788) was an Italian painter and engraver, active in Cremona and Rome.

Biography
He was a pupil of Giacomo Guerrini in Cremona, and obtained a stipend to study in Rome.

He engraved a depiction of the frescoes in the walls of the Vatican library for the work of Augustinus Vairani called Cremonensium Monumenta Romae extantia. Darosio died poverty in the Hospital of San Carlo of Rome.

References

18th-century Italian painters
Italian male painters
Italian engravers
1788 deaths
1744 births
Artists from Cremona
18th-century Italian male artists